is a railway station on Kintetsu Minami Osaka Line in Higashisumiyoshi-ku, Osaka-shi, Ōsaka-fu, Japan.

Layout
Yata Station has two side platforms with two tracks elevated.

Platforms

Adjacent stations

	

Higashisumiyoshi-ku, Osaka
Railway stations in Japan opened in 1923
Railway stations in Osaka